Miscelus is a genus of beetles in the family Carabidae, containing the following species:

 Miscelus carinatus Andrewes, 1922
 Miscelus javanus Klug, 1834
 Miscelus luctosus Putzeys, 1875
 Miscelus sibling Darlington, 1968
 Miscelus unicolor Putzeys, 1846

References

Lebiinae